William Richard Cline (born 1941) is an American economist and a Senior Fellow at the Peterson Institute for International Economics.

He graduated from Princeton University in 1963 and received a PhD in 1969 from Yale, and was deputy director of development and trade research at the office of the assistant secretary for international affairs at the United States Department of the Treasury from 1971 to 1973. He worked at the Brookings Institution from 1973 to 1981. He has been a senior fellow at the Peterson Institute for International Economics since 1981, with a joint appointment at the Center for Global Development. He was deputy managing director and chief economist of the Institute of International Finance from 1996 to 2001.

He has written, edited and published a large number of papers. His research topics include capital flows, Debt Relief, the Environment, Finance, International Financial Institutions, Trade and Development, and the economics of global warming and Climate change and agriculture.

Selected works 
 The Economics of Global Warming (1992) by William R. Cline

References

External links 
 William Cline's page at the centre for global development
 

1941 births
Living people
21st-century American economists
Princeton University alumni
Peterson Institute for International Economics